The France Women's Sevens is an annual women's rugby sevens tournament, and one of the stops on the World Rugby Women's Sevens Series. France joined in the fourth year of the Series. As of the current 2019–20 season, the tournament is held at Stade Jean-Bouin in Paris, having returned to that venue after one edition at Parc des Sports Aguiléra in Biarritz. It had originally been held in Clermont-Ferrand, and later moved to Stade Jean-Bouin.

History
The tournament was launched in 2016 as the last stage of the annual World Rugby Women's Sevens Series, with first two editions played at the Gabriel-Montpied stadium in Clermont-Ferrand.

In 2018 the event moved to Jean-Bouin stadium in Paris, bringing together the men's and women's France Sevens at the same venue in a combined tournament.

However, for the 2019 edition, the French Rugby Federation and World Rugby chose to host separate men's and women's events again. This was done to improve the visibility of the women's competition as well as to avoid the possible unavailability of the Jean-Bouin stadium due to home matches hosted by the Stade Français Paris club. The 2019 France Women's Sevens was therefore relocated to Parc des Sports Aguiléra in Biarritz. The tournament would return to Paris for 2019–20 and beyond.

Champions

Team summary

See also
 France Sevens (men's tournament)

Notes

References

 
World Rugby Women's Sevens Series tournaments
International women's rugby union competitions hosted by France
Recurring sporting events established in 2016
2016 establishments in France